Domenico Cristiano (born 29 March 1976) is an Italian football coach and former player. He is currently in charge as head coach of Promozione amateurs Castel di Sangro.

Playing career
Born in Ravenna, Cristiano started his career at S.S. Lazio youth system. He made his Serie A debut on 10 April 1994 against Atalanta B.C. He then spent his career at Serie B clubs. In 1999, he joined Salernitana. In June 2001 he was signed by Napoli tagged for 5.25 billion lire (€2.71 million), and exchanged with Giorgio Di Vicino tagged for 5.5 billion lire (€2.84 million), thus only 250 million lire involved (€129,114). In summer 2005, Ascoli promoted due to Caso Genoa and Torino faced bankrupt, Cristiano played 16 games for the newcomer, including 10 start. At the end of season, he joined Rimini of Serie B.

Coaching career
In June 2019 he was named new head coach of Promozione club Castel di Sangro.

References

External links
 gazzetta.it
 

1976 births
Living people
Sportspeople from Ravenna
Italian footballers
S.S. Lazio players
Venezia F.C. players
A.C. Monza players
U.S. Salernitana 1919 players
A.S.D. Castel di Sangro Calcio players
Ascoli Calcio 1898 F.C. players
Rimini F.C. 1912 players
S.S.C. Napoli players
Aurora Pro Patria 1919 players
Serie A players
Serie B players
Association football midfielders
Footballers from Emilia-Romagna